Novotyryshkino is a rural locality (a selo) and the administrative center of Novotyryshkinsky Selsoviet, Smolensky District, Altai Krai, Russia. The population was 1,880 as of 2013. There are 22 streets in the locality.

Geography 
Novotyryshkino is located 38 km southwest of Smolenskoye (the district's administrative centre) by road. Sychyovka is the nearest rural locality.

References 

Rural localities in Smolensky District, Altai Krai